The Irish Intermediate League was a Northern Irish football competition for teams of intermediate status, which also included reserve sides of senior teams. The league ran from 1915 until 1954.

History
It began in 1915 after the amalgamation of the Irish Junior League and Irish Senior Reserve League, and ran until 1954, when the majority of the remaining clubs applied to join the Irish League B Division, which had been formed in 1951. Until the introduction of the Irish League B Division it was the second tier of the Northern Ireland football league system.

The tournament also ran a cup tournament for members of the league, the McElroy Cup.

List of champions

 1915–16 Glentoran II*
 1916–17 Belfast Celtic II*
 1917–18 Belfast Celtic II*
 1918–19 Glentoran II*
 1919–20 Glentoran II*
 1920–21 Brantwood
 1921–22 Dundela
 1922–23 Crusaders
 1923–24 Dunmurry
 1924–25 Brantwood
 1925–26 Crusaders
 1926–27 Crusaders
 1927–28 Willowfield
 1928–29 Crusaders
 1929–30 Glentoran II*
 1930–31 Crusaders
 1931–32 Belfast Celtic II*
 1932–33 Crusaders
 1933–34 Belfast Celtic II*
 1934–35 Belfast Celtic II*
 1935–36 Belfast Celtic II*
 1936–37 Belfast Celtic II*
 1937–38 Crusaders
 1938–39 Crusaders
 1939–40 Linfield Swifts*
 1940–41 Bangor Reserves*
 1941–42 Aircraft United
 1942–43 Bangor Reserves*
 1943–44 Bangor Reserves*
 1944–45 Dundela
 1945–46 Linfield Swifts*
 1946–47 Dundela
 1947–48 Brantwood
 1948–49 Crusaders
 1949–50 Dundela
 1950–51 Dundela
 1951–52 Brantwood
 1952–53 Larne
 1953–54 Brantwood

NB - * denotes reserve teams of senior clubs

Performance by club

NB - * indicates reserve team

List of McElroy Cup winners

 1915–16 Glentoran II*
 1916–17 Belfast Celtic II*
 1917–18 Glentoran II*
 1918–19 Distillery II*
 1919–20 Cliftonville Olympic*
 1920–21 Distillery II*
 1921–22 St Mary's
 1922–23 Belfast United
 1923–24 St Mary's
 1924–25 Brantwood / Dunmurry (shared)
 1925–26 Linfield Rangers
 1926–27 Dunmurry
 1927–28 Broadway United
 1928–29 Linfield Swifts*
 1929–30 Crusaders
 1930–31 Newington Rangers
 1931–32 Crusaders
 1932–33 Belfast Celtic II*
 1933–34 Summerfield / Glentoran II* (shared)
 1934–35 Belfast Celtic II*
 1935–36 Belfast Celtic II*
 1936–37 Belfast Celtic II*
 1937–38 Linfield Swifts*
 1938–39 Glentoran II*
 1939–40 Linfield Swifts*
 1940–41 Ards II*
 1941–42 Ballyclare Comrades*
 1942–43 Belfast Celtic II*
 1943–44 Belfast Celtic II*
 1944–45 Linfield Swifts*
 1945–46 Dundela / Linfield Swifts* (shared)
 1946–47 Bangor Reserves
 1947–48 Crusaders
 1948–49 Larne

NB - * denotes reserve teams of senior clubs

Performance by club

NB - * indicates reserve team

References

External links
 Intermediate League Archive at the Irish Football Club Project
 McElroy Cup Archive at the Irish Football Club Project

Association football leagues in Northern Ireland
6